The banded racer (Platyceps plinii) is a species of colubrid snake.

Geographic range
It is found in India except for North Bengal tamilnadu and Kashmir, Sri Lanka, Pakistan, Nepal and Bangladesh.

Description
Snout obtuse, curved and prominent; rostral large, broader than wide, the portion visible from above more than half its length from the frontal; suture between the internasals as long as that between the prefrontals or a little shorter; frontal nearly as long as its distance from the end of the snout, or as the parietals; loreal as long as deep or longer than deep; one pre-ocular, usually with a small subocular below; two or three postoculars; temporals 2+2 or 2+3; upper labials 8, fourth and fifth entering the eye; 4 or 5 lower labials in contact with the anterior chin-shields; posterior chin-shields nearly as long as the anterior, separated from each other by two or three series of scales. Dorsals smooth, in 21 or 23 rows. Ventrals 197–225; anal divided; subcaudals 73–88. Yellowish or brownish olive above, with narrow white, brown, and black variegated cross bands on the anterior half of the body; these bands may entirely disappear in the adult; lower parts uniform yellowish.

Total length 1060 mm (3.5 feet); tail 220 mm (8.5 inches).

Shaw's original description of the species was based on a plate in Russell, Ind. Serp. (1796).

Notes

References
Shaw, G. 1802 General Zoology, or Systematic Natural History. Vol.3, part 1 + 2. G. Kearsley, Thomas Davison, London: 313-615
Wilson, Larry David 1967 Generic reallocation and review of Coluber fasciolatus Shaw (Serpentes: Colubridae) Herpetologica 23 (4): 260-275
Revealing two centuries of confusion:new insights on nomenclature and systematic position of/ v deepak 2021 https://doi.org/10.3897/vz.71.e64345

External links
Photo of Argyrogena fasciolata on Flickr
Photo of Argyrogena fasciolata on Cal Photos
Image of a juvenile Argyrogena fasciolata

Lycodon
Taxa named by George Shaw
Reptiles described in 1802
Reptiles of India
Reptiles of Pakistan
Reptiles of Nepal
Reptiles of Bangladesh